Alexander Kelly (1840–1907) was a Union Army soldier during the American Civil War.

Alexander Kelly may also refer to:

Alexander Kelly (pianist) (1929–1996), Scottish pianist and composer
Alexander Kelly, Australian winemaker and wine writer; founder of Tintara Winery

See also
Alex Kelly (disambiguation)